John Wayne Kappler (born December 22, 1943, in Baltimore, Maryland) is a professor in the Department of Integrated Immunology at National Jewish Health. His principal research is in T cell biology, a subject he collaborates on with his wife Philippa Marrack. In 1983 they discovered the T cell receptor, together with Ellis Reinherz and James Allison.

Awards
1986 – Appointed investigator, Howard Hughes Medical Institute
1989 – Elected member, National Academy of Sciences
1993 – Cancer Research Institute William B. Coley Award
1993 - Paul Ehrlich and Ludwig Darmstaedter Prize
1994 – Louisa Gross Horwitz Prize for Biology or Biochemistry (Columbia University)
2015 – Wolf Prize in Medicine

References

1943 births
Living people
American immunologists
Members of the United States National Academy of Sciences
Howard Hughes Medical Investigators
University of Denver faculty
Members of the National Academy of Medicine